Flight 514 may refer to:

 American Airlines Flight 514, crashed on 15 August 1959
 TWA Flight 514, crashed on 1 December 1974
 Mimika Air Flight 514, crashed on 17 April 2009
 Alrosa Flight 514, crash-landed on 7 September 2010

0514